Baie de Loutre is a former hamlet in the Canadian province of Newfoundland and Labrador.

It is located on Outer Bay in what was known as the "Burgeo and LaPoile District".

See also
List of ghost towns in Newfoundland and Labrador

Ghost towns in Newfoundland and Labrador